Castoreum  is a yellowish exudate from the castor sacs of mature beavers. Beavers use castoreum in combination with urine to scent mark their territory. Both beaver sexes have a pair of castor sacs and a pair of anal glands, located in two cavities under the skin between the pelvis and the base of the tail. The castor sacs are not true glands (endocrine or exocrine) on a cellular  level, hence references to these structures as preputial glands, castor glands, or scent glands are misnomers.

It is used as a tincture in some perfumes and was sometimes used as a food additive in the early 1900s.

Chemical composition 
At least 24 compounds are known constituents of beaver castoreum. Several of these have pheromonal activity, of which the phenols 4-ethylphenol and catechol and the ketones acetophenone and 3-hydroxyacetophenone were strongest. Five additional compounds elicit a weaker response: 4-methylcatechol, 4-methoxyacetophenone, 5-methoxysalicylic acid, salicylaldehyde, and 3-hydroxybenzoic acid. There are also oxygen-containing monoterpenes such as 6-methyl-l-heptanol, 4,6-dimethyl-l-heptanol, isopinocamphone, pinocamphone, and two linalool oxides and their acetates. Other compounds are: benzoic acid, benzyl alcohol, borneol, o-cresol, 4-(4'-hydroxyphenyl)-2-butanone, hydroquinone, phenol. All those compounds are gathered from plant food. It also contains nupharamine alkaloids and castoramine, and cis-cyclohexane-1,2-diol.

Uses

In perfume 

In perfumery, the term castoreum refers to the resinoid extract resulting from the dried and alcohol tinctured beaver castor. The dried beaver castor sacs are generally aged for two or more years to mellow.

Castoreum is largely used for its note suggesting leather, typically compounded with other ingredients including top, middle, and base notes. Some classic perfumes incorporating castor are Emeraude, Chanel Antaeus, Cuir de Russie, Magie Noire, Lancôme Caractère, Hechter Madame, Givenchy III, Shalimar, and many "leather" themed compositions.

In food 
In the United States, the Food and Drug Administration lists castoreum extract as a generally recognized as safe (GRAS) food additive. In 1965, the Flavor and Extract Manufacturers Association's GRAS program (FEMA 2261 and 2262) added castoreum extract and castoreum liquid. The annual industry consumption is very low, around 300 pounds, whereas vanillin is over 2.6 million pounds annually.

Castoreum has been traditionally used in Sweden for flavoring a variety of schnapps commonly referred to as "Bäverhojt" (literally, beaver shout).

Other 
Castoreum was also considered for use to contribute to the flavor and odor of cigarettes.

Medieval beekeepers used castoreum to increase honey production.

Related animal products 
 Taxea, a secretion of the badger's subcaudal glands comparable in its medicinal use to the better-known castoreum
 Hyraceum, the petrified and rock-like excrement composed of urine and feces excreted by the Cape hyrax (Procavia capensis), and a sought-after material that has been used in traditional South African medicine and perfumery

See also 
 Musk
 Ambergris
 Perfume - Animal sources
 Violet gland

References

External links 
The International Perfume Museum: Castoreum

Animal glandular products
Beavers